(born January 17, 1973) is a Japanese model, actress, voice actress and former singer whose birth name is .

Filmography

Movies
 Soseiji (1999)
 Harmful Insect (2001)
 Distance (2001)
 Rock'n Roll Mishin (2002)
 Azumi (2003)
 Bright Future aka Akarui Mirai(2003)
 Alive (2003)
 Casshern (2004)
 Walking with the Dog (2004)
 Canary (2005)
 Welcome to the Quiet Room  (2007)
 The Witch of the West is Dead (2008)
 Goemon (2009)
 Food Luck (2020)

TV dramas
 Long Vacation (1996 Fuji TV)
 Koi no bakansu (1997 NTV)
 Face (1997 Fuji TV)
 Aishi Suginakute Yokatta (1998 TV Asahi)
 Naomi (1999 Fuji TV)
 Joi (1999 NTV)
 Love Complex (2000 Fuji TV)
 Hero (2001 Fuji TV) in episode 9
 Hito ni Yasashiku (2002 Fuji TV)
 Nemurenu Yoru Wo Daite (2002 TV Asahi)
 Kaidan Hyaku Monogatari (2002 Fuji TV) in episode 7
 Message: Kotaba ga Uragitte Iku (2003 NTV)
 Boku to Kanojo to Kanojo no Ikiru Michi (2004 Fuji TV)
Rikon Bengoshi (2004 Fuji TV) in episode 5
 Ichiban Taisetsuna Date ~ Tokyo no Sora, Shanghai no Yume (2004 TBS)
 Last Christmas (2004 Fuji TV)
 Jikou Keisatsu (2006 TV Asahi) in episode 9
 Top Caster (2006 Fuji TV) in episode 5
 Suppli (2006 Fuji TV)
 Kirakira Kenshui (2007 TBS)
 Sexy Voice and Robo (2007 NTV) in episode 6
 Barefoot Gen (TV drama) (Hadashi no Gen) (2007 Fuji TV)
 Iryu 2 (2007 Fuji TV) in episode 1
 Mada Minu Chichi e, Haha e (2007 Fuji TV)
 Top Sales (2008 NHK) in episodes 1-2
 Hokaben (2008 NTV)
 Code Blue (2008 Fuji TV)
 Ryusei no Kizuna (2008 TBS)
 Code Blue SP (2009 Fuji TV)
 Zeni Geba (2009 NTV)
 Konkatsu! (2009 Fuji TV)
 Code Blue 2 (2010 Fuji TV)
 Bitter Sugar (2011 NHK)
 Taira no Kiyomori (NHK, 2012), Taikenmon'in no Horikawa
 Mare (NHK, 2015)
 The Supporting Actors 3 (TV Tokyo, 2021), herself

Video games
 Chaos Legion (2003), Siela Riviere

Dubbing
 Lightyear (2022), Alisha Hawthorne

Discography

Albums
  (1997)
 Indigo Blue (1998)

Singles
 "Hints of Love" (1996)
 "Hysteric Candy" (1997)
  (1997) (lyrics by singer/actress Kaori Moriwaka)
  (1997) (produced by Chara)

References

External links

1973 births
Living people
Japanese film actresses
Japanese television actresses
Japanese video game actresses
Japanese voice actresses
People from Saitama (city)
Japanese female models
Ken-On artists
20th-century Japanese actresses
21st-century Japanese actresses